In 2009, the Campeonato Brasileiro Série C, the third level of the Brazilian League, was contested by 20 clubs from May 24 to September 19, 2009. In an attempt to increase profits and interest on the competition, CBF decided to reduce the number of participating teams from 64 to 20 this season and establish regular membership, akin to Série A and Série B.

In the finals, América Mineiro, a traditional club from the city of Belo Horizonte, defeated ASA after winning away and at home. Top four clubes, the ones which qualified to the quarterfinals, ascended to the Campeonato Brasileiro Série B to be contested in 2010: América Mineiro, ASA, Icasa and Guaratinguetá. Meanwhile, the bottom four clubs, the ones that finished in last place of each group, were relegated to Série D next season: Sampaio Corrêa, Confiança, Mixto and Marcílio Dias.

Team information

Format
 First Stage: The 20 teams are divided in four groups of 5, playing within them in a double round-robin format. The two best ranked in each group advance towards next stage. The last placed team in each group is relegated to Série D 2010
 Quarterfinals: Eight qualified teams play in two-leg format, home and away. Winners qualify to semifinals and are promoted to Série B 2010.
 Semifinals: Quarterfinals winners play in two-leg format, home and away. Winners qualify to the Finals.
 Finals: Semifinals winners play in two-leg format, home and away. Winners are declared champions.

Results

First stage

Group A (AC-MA-MT-PA)

Group B (AL-CE-PE-SE)

Group C (DF-MT-MG-SP)

Group D (RS-SC-SP)

Knockout stages

* plays second leg at home.
(p) won on penalty shootout.
(a) won by away goals rule.

Quarterfinals
First leg played on August 9; Second leg played on August 16.

Team #1 played second match at home.

Semifinals
First leg played on August 23; Second leg played on August 30.

Team #1 played second match at home.

Finals
First leg played on September 13; Second leg played on September 19.

Team #1 played second match at home.

References

3
Campeonato Brasileiro Série C seasons